Zubovo-Polyansky District (Zubuń ajmak; , Pejkužo buje) is an administrative and municipal district (raion), one of the twenty-two in the Republic of Mordovia, Russia. It is located in the west of the republic. Its administrative center is the urban locality (a work settlement) of Zubova Polyana. As of the 2010 Census, the total population of the district was 59,256, with the population of Zubova Polyana accounting for 17.5% of that number.

Administrative and municipal status
Within the framework of administrative divisions, Zubovo-Polyansky District is one of the twenty-two in the republic. It is divided into four work settlements (administrative divisions with the administrative centers in the work settlements (inhabited localities) of Potma, Umyot, Yavas, and Zubova Polyana) and twenty-six selsoviets, all of which comprise ninety rural localities. As a municipal division, the district is incorporated as Zubovo-Polyansky Municipal District. The four work settlements are incorporated into four urban settlements, and the twenty-six selsoviets are incorporated into twenty-six rural settlements within the municipal district. The work settlement of Zubova Polyana serves as the administrative center of both the administrative and municipal district.

Notable residents 

Vladimir Dezhurov (born 1962 in Yavas), cosmonaut
Viktor Kidyayev (born 1956 in Zhukovka), politician

References

Notes

Sources

External links
Official website of Zubovo-Polyansky District 
Historical and ethnographic website of Zubovo-Polyansky District
Historical and ethnographic website of Zubovo-Polyansky District 

Districts of Mordovia
 
